The Republican Hindu Coalition is a Hindu-American conservative interest group in the United States that "was founded in 2015 to be the unique bridge between the Hindu-American community and  Republican policymakers and leaders."

Shalabh Kumar was inspired by the Republican Jewish Coalition to create RHC. RHC has offered $25 billion to support the Trump wall. The organization also supports a merit-based immigration system to allow "children of high-skilled workers awaiting green cards to be granted legal permanent residency immediately."

References

Conservative organizations in the United States
Organizations established in 2015
Republican Party (United States) organizations